Raymond Elmer Peters (April 17, 1903 – January 2, 1973) was an Associate Justice of the Supreme Court of California from March 26, 1959 to January 2, 1973.

Biography
Peters was born in Oakland on April 17, 1903, and educated in the public schools. After high school, he continued his education at the University of California, Berkeley School of Law, and graduated with a LL.B. degree.

In 1930, Peters became Chief Law Secretary of the California Supreme Court. In 1939, Governor Culbert Olson appointed Peters the Presiding Justice of the then District Court of Appeal, First District, Division One, replacing John F. Tyler. In December 1940, Peters was retained by the voters in the election. In November 1948, he was president of the conference of California judges, and led a study a code conduct of judicial proceedings. In February 1949, Chief Justice Phil S. Gibson appointed Peters to a two-year term on the State Judicial Council. His notable cases on the appellate bench include a September 1958 decision holding San Benito County's "right to work" ordinance is "unconstitutional and contrary to the state's public policy."

In 1959, by appointment of Governor Pat Brown, Peters became an associate justice of the California Supreme Court. At the same time, Governor Brown appointed Absalom Francis Brown as the new Presiding Justice of the appellate court's First District, Division One, and Mathew O. Tobriner to take Peter's seat as an associate justice on that court. A liberal lion on the court led by Roger J. Traynor, Peters' notable cases include In People v. Belous (1969), a landmark abortion decision that protected the constitutional right of a woman to control her own body. In December 1967, he wrote the majority opinion striking down the loyalty oath required in the state constitution of public employees. In 1971, he authored an opinion prohibiting discrimination on the basis of sex.

On January 2, 1973, Peters died while in office. Governor Ronald Reagan appointed William P. Clark Jr. to fill the vacant seat.

Personal life
Peters was married to Marion Estabrook and had one daughter, Janet E. (Peters) Garrison and one son Douglas who died at 16 years of age.

Footnotes

External links
 Raymond E. Peters. California Supreme Court Historical Society.
 Court opinions authored by Raymond E. Peters. Courtlistener.com.
 List of Past and Present Justices. California Court of Appeal, First District.
 Past & Present Justices. California State Courts.

See also
 List of justices of the Supreme Court of California

1903 births
1973 deaths
University of California, Berkeley alumni
UC Berkeley School of Law alumni
American legal scholars
20th-century American judges
Lawyers from Berkeley, California
Justices of the Supreme Court of California
Judges of the California Courts of Appeal
20th-century American lawyers